The  ("Head of [the] Council"; plural usually  ) is the chairperson (or speaker) of , the lower house of the  (parliament) of Ireland. The  since 10 March 2016 has been Seán Ó Fearghaíl,  TD. The  since 23 July 2020 has been Catherine Connolly, Independent TD.

Overview
The Ceann Comhairle is expected to observe strict impartiality. Despite this, a government usually tries to select a member of its own political party for the position, if it has enough deputies to allow that choice. In order to protect the neutrality of the chair, the Constitution of Ireland provides that an incumbent Ceann Comhairle does not seek re-election as a Teachta Dála (Deputy to the Dáil), but rather is deemed automatically to have been re-elected by their constituency at that general election, unless they are retiring. As a consequence, the constituency that an incumbent Ceann Comhairle represents elects one fewer TD in a general election than its usual entitlement, but still has the same number of TDs. Under standing orders, no member of the government or Minister of State may act as Ceann Comhairle or Leas-Cheann Comhairle.

The Ceann Comhairle does not take part in debates, nor do they vote except in the event of a tie. In this event, they generally vote in accordance with the parliamentary conventions relating to the Speaker of the British House of Commons, which tend to amount to voting against motions. The Ceann Comhairle formally opens each day's sitting by reading the official prayer. The Ceann Comhairle is the sole judge of order in the house and has a number of special functions. Specifically, the Ceann Comhairle:

Calls on members to speak. All speeches must be addressed to the Ceann Comhairle.
Puts such questions to the house, and supervises and declares the results of divisions.
Has authority to suppress disorder. To ensure obedience to his rulings the Ceann Comhairle may order members to withdraw from the Dáil or suspend an individual from the House for a period. In the case of great disorder, the Ceann Comhairle can suspend or adjourn the house.
Rings a bell when deputies are out of order. The bell is a half-sized reproduction of the ancient bell of Lough Lene Castle found at Castle Island, Lough Lene, Castlepollard, County Westmeath in 1881 and now in the National Museum. The reproduction was presented in 1931 by the widow of Bryan Cooper, a former TD.

The Ceann Comhairle is an  member of the Presidential Commission, the Council of State, and the Commission for Public Service Appointments.

Since the 1937 Constitution, the Ceann Comhairle has been an  member of the Council of State, beginning with Frank Fahy. The earlier presiding officers never served on the Council of State: i.e. those of the Revolutionary Dáil (1919–22: Cathal Brugha, George Noble Plunkett, Eoin MacNeill, and Michael Hayes) and the Free State Dáil (1922–36: Hayes again, before Fahy).

History
The position of Ceann Comhairle was created on the first day of the Dáil on 21 January 1919, when it was first established as a breakaway revolutionary parliament. The first Ceann Comhairle was Cathal Brugha, who served for only one day, presiding over the Dáil's first meeting, before leaving the post to become President of Dáil Éireann. The office was continued under the 1922–37 Irish Free State, the constitution of which referred to the office-holder as the "Chairman of Dáil Éireann". The practice of automatically re-electing the Ceann Comhairle in a general election was introduced by a constitutional amendment in 1927. The outgoing Ceann Comhairle is returned at the election for their former party.

Following the abolition on 11 December 1936 of the office of Governor-General, the Ceann Comhairle was assigned some of the former office's ceremonial functions, including signing bills into law and convening and dissolving the Dáil. These powers were transferred to the new office of President of Ireland when a new Constitution came into force on 29 December 1937, being carried out by the Presidential Commission, which included the Ceann Comhairle, until the first president entered office on 25 June 1938. The new Constitution retained the position of Ceann Comhairle and the practice of automatic re-election.

Patrick Hogan retired due to ill health in 1967, and died in 1969 before the following election. Joseph Brennan died in office in 1980. John O'Donoghue resigned the office in 2009 after an expenses scandal. As an ordinary TD he was no longer entitled to be returned automatically at the next general election in 2011, in which he lost his seat.

The Ceann Comhairle was first elected by secret ballot in 2016.

Rules for election
Under the rules for the election of the Ceann Comhairle, introduced during the 31st Dáil, candidates must be nominated by at least seven other members of Dáil Éireann. Each member may nominate only one candidate. Nominations must be submitted to the Clerk of the Dáil by not later than 6 p.m. on the day before the first day the Dáil meets after the general election in order to be valid, but may be withdrawn at any time up to the close of nominations.

If more than one candidate is nominated, the Dáil will vote by secret ballot in order of preference after the candidates' speeches, which may not exceed five minutes, with an absolute majority required for victory. If no candidate wins a majority on first preferences, the individual with the fewest votes will be eliminated and their votes redistributed in accordance with their next highest preference, under the alternative vote voting system. Eliminations and redistributions will continue until one member receives the requisite absolute majority. Then, the House will vote on a formal motion to appoint the member in question to the position of Ceann Comhairle. The Clerk of the Dáil will be the presiding officer of the House during the election process.

List of Cinn Comhairle

Ceann Comhairle
For each Ceann Comhairle, this tables lists the number of the Dáil, the period in which they held office, their constituencies and their political affiliation immediately prior to their appointment.

Leas-Cheann Comhairle

The Leas-Cheann Comhairle holds office as the Deputy Chairperson of Dáil Éireann under Article 15.9.1 of the constitution. In the absence of the Ceann Comhairle, the Leas-Cheann Comhairle deputises and performs the duties and exercises the authority of the Ceann Comhairle in Dáil proceedings. The Leas-Cheann Comhairle is also elected by secret ballot. The current Leas-Cheann Comhairle is Independent TD Catherine Connolly. She is the first female TD to hold the position. Traditionally, the position was reserved for an Opposition TD. The role carries the pay and status as a Minister of State.

See also
Cathaoirleach (Chairperson of Seanad Éireann)
Politics of the Republic of Ireland
History of the Republic of Ireland
Dáil Éireann (Irish Republic)
Dáil Éireann (Irish Free State)
Speaker of the Northern Ireland Assembly, who is referred to as Ceann Comhairle when Irish is spoken.

Footnotes

References

Sources

Citations

External links

Lough Lene Bell, maquette photo

Politics of the Republic of Ireland
Titles of national or ethnic leadership
 
Lists of political office-holders in the Republic of Ireland
Lists of legislative speakers
1919 establishments in Ireland